Reeza Raphael Hendricks (born 14 August 1989) is a South African cricketer who plays for Gauteng and for the South Africa national cricket team. He is a right-handed opening batsman. He made his international debut for South Africa in November 2014 by becoming only the third South African to score a century on debut.

Domestic career
In November 2017, Hendricks scored his first century in a Twenty20 match, when he made 102 not out for Lions against Dolphins in the 2017–18 Ram Slam T20 Challenge. He was the leading run-scorer during the tournament, finishing with 361 runs in eight matches. In January 2018, he became the first player to score a century in all three franchise competitions in South Africa in the same season, after scoring a List A century in the final round of the 2017–18 Momentum One Day Cup.

In June 2018, Hendricks was named in the squad for the Highveld Lions team for the 2018–19 season. In October 2018, he was named in Jozi Stars' squad for the first edition of the Mzansi Super League T20 tournament. Hendricks scored 410 runs in MSL 2018, subsequently earning a place in the national side. In September 2019, he was named in the squad for the Jozi Stars team for the 2019 Mzansi Super League tournament. In April 2021, he was named in Gauteng's squad, ahead of the 2021–22 cricket season in South Africa.

In April 2022, in the Division One final of the 2021–22 CSA One-Day Cup, Hendricks scored 157 runs for Lions, as they beat Titans by three wickets to win the title.

In September 2022 Hendricks was bought by the Johannesburg Super Kings for the inaugural season of the SA20 competition, scheduled to take place in 2023.

International career
Hendricks made his Twenty20 International debut for South Africa against Australia on 5 November 2014. He was included in the Griqualand West cricket team squad for the 2015 Africa T20 Cup. In August 2017, he was named in Pretoria Mavericks' squad for the first season of the T20 Global League. However, in October 2017, Cricket South Africa initially postponed the tournament until November 2018, with it being cancelled soon after.

In June 2018, Hendricks was named in South Africa's One Day International (ODI) squad for their series against Sri Lanka. He made his ODI debut for South Africa against Sri Lanka on 5 August 2018. He became the third batsman for South Africa, and fourteenth overall, to score a century on ODI debut. His 88-ball century was the fastest by a batsman on ODI debut and he won the man of the match award.

In September 2021, Hendricks was named in South Africa's squad for the 2021 ICC Men's T20 World Cup.

References

External links 
 

1969 births
Living people
Cape Coloureds
Cricketers from Kimberley, Northern Cape
South African cricketers
South Africa One Day International cricketers
South Africa Twenty20 International cricketers
Cricketers who made a century on One Day International debut
Gauteng cricketers
Griqualand West cricketers
Jozi Stars cricketers
Knights cricketers
Lions cricketers